The ninth season of La Voz started airing on 23 September 2022 on Antena 3. Luis Fonsi returned as the only coach from the previous season, while Antonio Orozco, Pablo López, and Laura Pausini after one season hiatus returned for their fifth, fourth, and third season, respectively. This season was produced to be a dedication to the ten-year anniversary of the show. It was announced by Antena 3 that these four coaches were the ones who trusted and invested in this show from the beginning.

Javier Crespo was announced the winner of the ninth season, marking Antonio Orozco's second win as a coach.

Panelists

Coaches & Host 
It was announced on Sep.1 2022 that Luis Fonsi would be the only coach returning from last season. The winning coach Pablo Alborán from season 8, Malú, and Alejandro Sanz would not be returning this season. Antonio Orozco, Pablo López, and Laura Pausini after one season hiatus returned for their fifth, fourth, and third season, respectively. Meanwhile, Eva González returned as the host for her fourth season.

Advisors 
In The Great Battles and the Knockouts, the four coaches invited singers to join them to coach their artists. In the Great Battles and the first phase of the Knockouts, Fonsi invited Lola Indigo, Antonio brought along Mala Rodríguez, Vanesa Martín joined Laura, and Raphael with Pablo. The coaches from the inaugural season, David Bisbal, Malú, Rosario, and Melendi joined the four coaches in the second phase of the Knockouts this season.

Teams

  Winner
  Runner-up
  Third Place
  Fourth Place
  Artist was Eliminated in Semifinal
  Artist was Eliminated in Quarter-Final
  Artist was Eliminated in the Phase 2 of Knockouts
  Artist was Stolen in the Phase 1 of Knockouts
  Artist was Eliminated in the Phase 1 of Knockouts
  Artist was Eliminated in The Great Battles

Blind Auditions

Introduction 
The Blind Auditions premiered on September 23, 2022. The coaches kicked off the season with a performance of "Yo no me doy por vencido".

This season, each coach ends up with 14 artists by the end of the blind auditions, creating a total of 56 artists advancing to The Great Battles. The show canceled "The Comeback Stage" which was implemented in season 7 and season 8, so the artists who didn't get a coach turned around got eliminated immediately.

In addition, each coach was given three 'Blocks'. The coach can choose to push the 'block' button to prevent another coach from turning and getting the artist.

Notes & Color Keys 

 Though each coach was given three 'blocks', Fonsi didn't use his third 'block' in the Blinds.
 A 'four-chair-turn' is received by a contestant once they got all four coaches attempted to turn for them, even if the coach was blocked.
 The contestant Javier Crespo auditioned in the second episode participated in La Voz Kids Season 6 (2021) and was originally part of Team Melendi, before being stolen by Vanesa Martín. He was a finalist of the season but was eliminated in the first phase of the Final.

Blind Auditions Results

The Great Battles 
The Great Battles aired on November 4, 2022. Same as last season, this season features "The Great Battles" where the coaches pair their artists into four groups of three to five where they sing a song together.

For each team, the coach will have to decide if any of the artists in this group receives the 'Fast-Pass' so that the artist will advance to the next round right away. After all four groups performed, the coach then chooses six contestants to advance to the Knockouts while others will be eliminated, regardless of which group they were in. Also, there is no 'Steal' or 'Save' available for coaches to get artists from other teams or save their own contestants.

This season, the four coaches invited singers as advisors to join them in the Great Battles. Fonsi invited Lola Indigo, Antonio brought along Mala Rodríguez, Vanesa Martin joined Laura, and Raphael with Pablo.

The four coaches performed "Entre sobras y sobras me faltas" by Antonio Orozco at the beginning of the episode.

Knockouts 
In this round the remaining 28 artists, 7 per team, will compete for their spots in the Lives. Just as last season, this season the Knockouts is divided into two phases.

This season, the four advisors invited by the coaches in the "The Great Battles" continued to be on the show in the first phase of the Knockouts. As for the second phase, David Bisbal, Malú, Rosario, and Melendi joined the four coaches as advisors.

Phase 1 
In the first phase, the seven artists on each team will perform one by one. Only one artist will receive the 'Fast-Pass (Pase Directo)' and directly advance to the Lives. Three artists will be put in the 'Danger Zone' where they will compete for two remaining spots in the second phase. In addition, each coach was given a 'Steal' to get an artist from another team to advance to the Lives. Once an artist is announced to be put into the 'Danger Zone', the coach whose 'Steal' is still available will have the chance to steal the artist. Artists who got stolen will automatically advance to the Lives. After an artist got stolen, the coach of the team then chooses another artist for the 'Danger Zone'. This procedure comes to an end once there are three artists officially in the 'Danger Zone'. The remaining artists will be eliminated in this round and won't have the chance to compete next week.

The first episode of the Knockouts features Team Pablo and Team Laura. Both coaches performed a song together with their advisor before their artists began to perform. Pablo López and his advisor Raphael performed "Lo saben mis zapatos". Laura Pausini and her advisor Vanesa Martín took the stage with "Yo sí".

The second episode of the Knockouts features Team Antonio and Team Fonsi. Both coaches performed a song together with their advisor before their artists began to perform. Luis Fonsi and his advisor Lola Índigo performed "Imposible". Antonio Orozco and his advisor Mala Rodríguez sang "Tengo que contarte" together.

Phase 2 
In the second phase, the remaining three artists on each team perform individually for the final two spots left on their coaches' team in the Lives. The audience will have the opportunity to decide which artists advance. Among the three artists, the one with the most vote will be saved by the public and advance to the Lives. The coach then chooses another artist out of the remaining two to advance, eliminating the other one.

The four coaches invited another round of advisors in this phase. David Bisbal, Rosario, Malú and Melendi, who were the coaches of the debut season of the series. They performed "Vivir deprisa" by Alejandro Sanz at the beginning of the episode.

Live shows

Week 1: Quarter-Final 
The Lives aired on December 1, 2022. The Top 16 artists, four from each team, performed one by one. For each team, the artist with the most votes from the public will advance to the Semi-Final, the coach then chooses one artist out of the remaining three to as the second semi-finalist. Only 8 artists will move on to the Semi-Final.

Laura Pausini, Pablo López, Antonio Orozco and Luis Fonsi kicked off the Quarter-Final performing "En cambio no" by Laura Pausini.

Week 2: Semi-Final 
The Semi-Final aired on December 9, 2022. For each team, the remaining two artists first perform with their coach and then the guest invited by their coach. The guests are the advisors for the second phase of the Knockouts. After the duets, they will have to take the stage individually for a solo performance. The four artists who receive the most vote from the public, regardless of which team they are on, will advance to the Grand Final.

With the elimination of Ana Corbel and Javier Santacruz, Pablo López no longer has any artist remaining to represent him in the Grand Final. This is the second time that he has no artists in the final.

Additionally, with the advancement of Sergio del Boccio and Ana González, this marks the second time that Laura Pausini has two artists representing her in the Grand Final.

Week 3: Grand Final 
It was announced on December 14 by Antena that the Grand Final will feature Raphael, Ana Mena, Malú, María José Llergo, Melendi and Manuel Carrasco joining the show for duets with the finalists. The winner of 'La Voz' will also have as a prize to be the opening act for the next edition of Stalite Catalana Occidente.

In the Grand Final, the four finalists have to each sing a duet with one of the guests and then take the stage with a solo performance.

Ratings & Reception 
'La Voz' sweeps every Friday on Antena 3. The talent show continues incombustible and has been the absolute leader during its broadcast slot and the leading entertainment program each week. This season has maintained an 18.3% average screen share with 1.7 million viewers, even improving the performance of the previous edition of the format. It was reported that an active 5.2 million viewers tune in through Antena 3 for the show 'La Voz' each Friday.

As for the performance of targeted market share, 'La Voz' triumphs and takes the overall lead. It achieves its best results among viewers aged 13 to 24 with a 20.6% average screen share. In regions such as Murcia (25.9%), Madrid (20.7%), Andalusia (20.4%), Canary Islands (20.1%), Valencia (19.9%) or Castilla y León (19.7%), 'La Voz' remains to be the steady leader.

References

The Voice (franchise)